Leptopelis broadleyi (Broadley's forest tree frog) is a species of frog in the family Arthroleptidae of uncertain status. The Amphibian Species of the World, the IUCN SSC Amphibian Specialist Group, and the African Amphibians do not recognize it, but instead consider it synonym with Leptopelis argenteus. (ASW expresses some hesitation though.) However, the AmphibiaWeb recognizes it as a valid species.

Distribution
Leptopelis broadleyi is found in Malawi, Mozambique, and Zimbabwe.

Habitat and conservation
This species occurs in forest-savanna mosaic and along forested streams through savanna.

Leptopelis broadleyi was assessed in 2004 by the International Union for Conservation of Nature (IUCN) as being of "Least Concern"; in the 2016 assessment, it was brought into synonymy with Leptopelis argenteus.

References

broadleyi
Frogs of Africa
Amphibians of Malawi
Amphibians of Mozambique
Amphibians of Zimbabwe
Amphibians described in 1985
Taxonomy articles created by Polbot
Taxobox binomials not recognized by IUCN